Calliostoma unicum, common name Dall's unicum top shell, is a species of sea snail, a marine gastropod mollusk in the family Calliostomatidae.

Some authors place this taxon in the subgenus Calliostoma (Tristichotrochus)

Description
The height of the shell varies between 13 mm and 23 mm. 
The solid, conical shell is imperforate. It has seven, inflated globose whorls with a rounded periphery and a closed umbilicus.  The whorls show a more or less obvious angle or carina in the middle of the upper surface. The body whorl is subangular or rounded at the periphery and convex beneath. The surface texture consists of numerous, unequal spiral striations which are beaded on the early whorls. These striations are slightly crenulated by regular incremental lines. These striations number about 9 on the penultimate whorl, 12–14 on the base. The low spire is rather short. The acute apex is red or purplish. The oblique, rhomboidal aperture is white and nacreous. The lip is very much thickened within. The oblique columella is concave above, cylindrical, and has a groove marking the place of the umbilicus.

The base color is a light reddish brown with irregular maculations of darker brown above and a row of small alternating white and dark brown spots encircling the whorls. It has a brown-articulated peripheral girdle. The base of the shell is generally not marked.

Distribution
This marine species is found from Central Honshu, Japan southwards at 10 to 20 m depth., also off China, Korea and Taiwan.

References

External links
 

unicum
Gastropods described in 1860